Mother Night is a novel by American author Kurt Vonnegut, first published in February 1962. The title of the book is taken from Goethe's Faust (and ultimately from the Egyptian Goddess Nuit, mother of Osiris, Horus, Isis, Set, and Nephthys, and her counterparts in European religions, such as Skaði).

The novel takes the form of the fictional memoirs of Howard W. Campbell Jr., an American, who moved to Germany in 1923 at age 11, and later became a well-known playwright and Nazi propagandist. The story of the novel is narrated (through the use of metafiction) by Campbell himself, writing his memoirs while awaiting trial for war crimes in an Israeli prison. Howard W. Campbell also appears briefly in Vonnegut's later novel Slaughterhouse-Five.

Plot summary
The novel is framed as the memoir of Howard W. Campbell, Jr. He is writing it while imprisoned and waiting for his war crimes trial for his actions as a Nazi propagandist. Campbell, an American who moved to Germany with his parents at age 11, recounts his childhood as the Nazi Party is consolidating its power. Instead of leaving the country with his parents, Campbell continues his career as a playwright, his only social contacts being Nazis. Being of sufficiently ″Aryan″ heritage, Campbell becomes a member of the party in name only. He is politically apathetic, caring only for his art and his wife Helga, who is also the starring actress in all of his plays.

Campbell is later approached by Frank Wirtanen, an agent of the U.S. War Department. Wirtanen wants Campbell to spy as a double agent for the United States in the impending world war. Campbell rejects the offer, but Wirtanen quickly adds that he wants Campbell to think about it. Once the war starts, Campbell begins to make his way up through Joseph Goebbels' Propaganda Ministry, eventually becoming the "voice" of broadcasts aimed at converting Americans to the Nazi cause (a parallel to the real broadcaster, Dr. Edward Vieth Sittler). Unbeknownst to the Nazis, all of the idiosyncrasies of Campbell's speeches – deliberate pauses, coughing, etc. – are part of the coded information he is passing to the American Office of Strategic Services (OSS). Campbell never discovers, nor is he ever told, the information that he is sending.

About halfway through the war, Helga goes to the Eastern Front to entertain German troops. Campbell is extremely distraught when he hears that the camp Helga visited in Crimea has been overrun by Soviet troops and she is presumed dead. In early 1945, just before the Red Army captures Berlin, Campbell visits his in-laws one last time. During the visit, he has a conversation with Helga's younger sister, Resi, that resonates with him for years afterward. After Campbell is captured by American forces, Wirtanen works out a deal in which he is set free and given passage to New York City.

Fifteen years later, Campbell lives an anonymous life, sustained only by memories of his wife and an indifferent curiosity about his eventual fate. His only friend is George Kraft, a likewise lonely neighbor—who, through an extraordinary coincidence, also happens to be a Soviet intelligence agent. He tries to trick Campbell into fleeing to Moscow by publicizing his identity and location. A white supremacist organization makes Campbell a cause célèbre, inviting him to speak to new recruits. The group's leader, a dentist named Lionel Jones, shows up at Campbell's apartment with a surprise: a woman claiming to be Helga, alive and well and professing her undying love. Campbell's will to live returns, and remains even after he finds out that she is not Helga, but rather Resi. They plan to escape to Mexico City after attending one of Jones' fascist meetings.

There, Wirtanen makes an appearance to warn Campbell of Kraft's plot and Resi's complicity. Heartbroken, Campbell decides to go along with the charade. He confronts Kraft and Resi, the latter swearing her feelings for him are genuine. The FBI then raids the meeting and takes Campbell into custody, while Resi commits suicide by taking a cyanide capsule. As before, Wirtanen uses his influence to have Campbell set free. Once Campbell returns to his apartment, however, he realizes that he has no real reason to continue living, and decides to turn himself in to the Israelis to stand trial.

While imprisoned in Israel, Campbell meets Adolf Eichmann and gives him advice on how to write an autobiography. At the very end of the book, he inserts a letter that he has just received from Wirtanen. The corroborating evidence that he was indeed an American spy has finally arrived, and Wirtanen writes that he will testify to Campbell's true loyalties in court. Rather than being relieved, Campbell feels disgusted by the idea that he will be saved from death and granted freedom only when he is no longer able to enjoy anything that life has to offer (too old and physically worn out). In the last lines, Campbell tells the reader that he will hang himself not for crimes against humanity, but rather for "crimes against himself." Campbell then realizes that he is alone in the world.

Metafiction: above the text

Throughout the novel Vonnegut uses metafiction devices to call attention to the text itself.  Most notable is Vonnegut's framing of the novel as a historical document.  The editor's note at the beginning of the novel suggests Campbell's writings, the text of the novel itself, are a manuscript that Vonnegut received and is editing for public view.

These devices of meta-fiction can also be expanded to include Vonnegut's approach to character introductions, and character development. Vonnegut uses Campbell's distance in time to observe characters from an almost omniscient perspective; for example, "His name is Andor Gutman. Andor is a sleepy, not very bright Estonian Jew. He spent two years in the extermination camp at Auschwitz. According to his own reluctant account, he came this close to going up a smokestack of a crematorium there." This allows any perceived information over the course of the novel to be distilled and relayed in a more clipped, passive manner that uses a greater control of first-person narration.

While this style of character deconstructionism is less prevalent in Mother Night than it is in God Bless You, Mr. Rosewater, or Breakfast of Champions, the pervading-style of prose throughout the book is largely intertwined with meta-fiction techniques. Vonnegut's innovative literary omniscience is one of the techniques through which Vonnegut's trademark "so it goes..." attitude achieves a certain degree of meta-morality by virtue of its omniscient, dissociative and detached tone within the prose.

Vonnegut also addresses the story's "moral" several times. He writes, "This is the only story of mine whose moral I know. I don't think it's a marvelous moral, I just happen to know what it is..." The phrase "The moral of the story" appears and again; some examples include "We are what we pretend to be, so we must be careful about what we pretend to be," "When you're dead, you're dead," and "Make love when you can. It's good for you."

Adaptations
A film adaptation was released in 1996, starring Nick Nolte as Campbell, Sheryl Lee as Helga/Resi, Alan Arkin as Kraft and John Goodman as Wirtanen.

In 2009, Audible.com produced an audio version of Mother Night, narrated by Victor Bevine, as part of its Modern Vanguard line of audiobooks.

A theatrical version, adapted and directed by Brian Katz, was premiered at the Custom Made Theater Company in San Francisco in 2017. A revival, also directed by Katz, was presented at 59E59 Theatres in New York in October of 2018.

References

Links 

 

1962 American novels
American novels adapted into films
American novels adapted into plays
Fiction with unreliable narrators
Gold Medal Books books
Novels by Kurt Vonnegut
Novels about Nazi Germany
Novels set in Germany
Novels set in Israel
Novels set in New York City
Postmodern novels
Written fiction presented as fact
Novels about propaganda
Cultural depictions of Joseph Goebbels
Novels set in the 1930s
Novels set in the 1940s
Novels set in the 1950s
Novels set in the 1960s
Novels set during World War II